Amblyornis is a genus of bowerbirds belonging to the family Ptilonorhynchidae. Established by Daniel Giraud Elliot in 1872, it contains five species:

Species

The name Amblyornis is a combination of the Greek words amblus, meaning "dull" and ornis, meaning "bird".

References

 
Bird genera